Drina is a genus of butterflies in the family Lycaenidae. The species of this genus are found in the Indomalayan realm.

Species
Drina ninoda Druce, 1895
Drina donina (Hewitson, 1865) - brown yamfly
Drina cowani Corbet, 1940
Drina maneia (Hewitson, 1863)
Drina mariae Eliot, 1969
Drina mavortia (Hewitson, 1869)
Drina discophora (C. & R. Felder, 1862)

External links
"Drina de Nicéville in Marshall & de Nicéville, 1890" at Markku Savela's Lepidoptera and Some Other Life Forms

 
Loxurini
Lycaenidae genera
Taxa named by Lionel de Nicéville